Constitution Hall may refer to:

 DAR Constitution Hall, a concert hall in Washington, D.C.
 Constitution Hall (Lecompton, Kansas), listed in the NRHP
 Constitution Hall (Topeka, Kansas)
 Constitution Hall (University of Alaska Fairbanks), listed in the NRHP